Marcel Senn (born 10 July 1934) is a Swiss racing cyclist. He rode in the 1957 Tour de France.

References

1934 births
Living people
Swiss male cyclists
Place of birth missing (living people)